Charles Dickson (1746 – 3 September 1796) was a merchant, shipbuilder, farmer, and political figure in Nova Scotia. He represented Onslow Township in the Nova Scotia House of Assembly from 1776 to 1777 and from 1783 to his death in 1796.

He was born in New England and moved to King's County in Nova Scotia at a young age. In 1772, he married Amelia Bishop, daughter of John and Mary Bishop. Around the same time, Dickson settled in Onslow. He served as registrar of deeds for Colchester County from 1777 to 1796 and was also a justice of the peace. During a visit to the West Indies in 1796, he contracted yellow fever and died at Halifax on his return.

His sons Thomas, Robert, and William became members of the provincial assembly. His daughter Elizabeth married Samuel George William Archibald, also a member of the assembly.

Family

 John married 20 October 1796 to Lydia Hamilton.
 Charles married 31 December 1799 to Rachel Todd Archibald.
 Robert married 1798 to Lavinia DeWolf
 William married 29 January 1801 to Rebecca Pearson.
 Abigail married 27 February 1798 to Andrew Wallace.
 Sarah died young.
 Mary (-twin) married 1803 to John Murray Upham.
 Olivia (-twin) married 5 February 1801 to David Archibald.
 Elizabeth married 16 March to Samuel George William Archibald.
 Thomas married Sarah Ann Patterson.
 Lavinia (unknown) married 27 April 1823 to John Burnyeat.

References 
 

1746 births
1796 deaths
18th-century British North American people
18th-century Canadian politicians
Canadian people of Ulster-Scottish descent
British emigrants to pre-Confederation Nova Scotia
Nova Scotia pre-Confederation MLAs
People from Colchester County
People from Kings County, Nova Scotia
Burials at Kensico Cemetery